Mark Jackson (born June 12, 1954) is a former American football quarterback He played six seasons in the Canadian Football League with the Montreal Alouettes, Toronto Argonauts and Winnipeg Blue Bombers. He played college football at Baylor University and attended Carlsbad High School in Carlsbad, New Mexico.

References

External links
Just Sports Stats
College stats
Fanbase profile

Living people
1954 births
Players of American football from New Mexico
American football quarterbacks
Canadian football quarterbacks
American players of Canadian football
Baylor Bears football players
Montreal Alouettes players
Toronto Argonauts players
Winnipeg Blue Bombers players
People from Carlsbad, New Mexico